Redenbach is a surname. Notable people with the surname include:

 Michael Redenbach (disambiguation), multiple people
 Tyler Redenbach (born 1984), Canadian ice hockey player